The Church of the Holy and Undivided Trinity with Saint Jude, Upper Chelsea, commonly called Holy Trinity Sloane Street or Holy Trinity Sloane Square, is a Church of England parish church in London, England. It was built in 1888–90 at the south-eastern side of Sloane Street, to a striking Arts and Crafts design, by the architect John Dando Sedding, and paid for by 5th Earl Cadogan, in whose London estate it lay. It replaced an earlier building only half its size which, at the time of its demolition, was less than 60 years old.

History

Original building
The first church on the site was a Gothic construction of 1828–30 designed by James Savage, built in brick with stone dressings. The west front, towards the street, had an entrance flanked by octagonal turrets topped with spires. Its seating capacity was recorded as 1,450 in 1838 and 1,600 in 1881.  It was originally intended as chapel of ease to the new parish church of St Luke, but was given its own parish, sometimes known as Upper Chelsea, in 1831. It was closed and demolished in 1888, and a temporary iron church with a capacity of 800 was provided in Symons Street while a new building was under construction.

Present building

The new building, the present Holy Trinity, was built on a grand scale to a design by John Dando Sedding. The internal fittings were the work of leading sculptors and designers of the day, including F. W. Pomeroy, H. H. Armstead, Onslow Ford and Hamo Thornycroft. Sedding died in 1891 (his memorial can be seen on the north wall in the Lady Chapel) and Henry Wilson took charge of the project to complete the interior decoration of the building to the original design. In part, he failed, for some of the glass was never installed, nor was the important addition of a frieze beneath the high windows even attempted. Some of the internal sculpture or carving is still incomplete. In the 1920s the interior was whitened by F. C. Eden, lightening the character and feel of the building considerably.

The church has an important collection of stained glass, including an enormous east window by Edward Burne-Jones and William Morris; there are also windows by William Blake Richmond (including some highly decadent imagery), Powells (the Memorial Chapel) and Christopher Whall (the incomplete clerestory sequence and two striking windows on the south side of the nave). The large west window, which Morris and Burne-Jones had apparently hoped to complete before moving onto the east window, was never done and the plain glass in it was eventually destroyed by enemy action, although all the other windows survived or were repaired. The project to glaze the west window remains to be realised.

The churchmanship at the time of the opening of the new building might be described as eclectically high, as the liturgy seems to have been drawn from a number of sources and traditions, although at this distance it is hard to gauge what exactly was done. After a long period of less symbolic worship, notably under the long tenure (1945–1980) of Alfred Basil Carver and the shorter incumbencies of his successors Phillip Roberts (1980–1987) and Keith Yates (1987–1997), the building has now returned to a liberal Catholic style of worship.

The church was badly damaged by incendiary bombs in World War II but was restored more or less to its previous appearance by the early 1960s. There was then a concerted attempt by the church authorities to close and demolish the building, replacing it with something smaller but this was thwarted by a campaign led by John Betjeman and the Victorian Society. The building now houses a thriving congregation built during the ten years under the incumbency (1997–2007) of Michael Eric Marshall, the former Bishop of Woolwich. The connection with the world of the fine arts, not only represented in the building and its fittings but also in sponsorship and encouragement of artists and musicians, continued under the Rev. Rob Gillion. Trained as an actor, Gillion became Rector late in 2008 but was elected Bishop of Riverina, the extensive diocese in western New South Wales, and moved there in August 2014. The current rector is Canon Nicholas Wheeler, who returned to England in 2015 following work in Rio de Janeiro.

Music

Holy Trinity has enjoyed a reputation for Anglican church music since its early days. A full choir was maintained from the completion of the present building until the 1970s directed by leading church musicians of their time, mentioned below. Since 1987, when Keith Yates attempted a revival, choral music has thrived thanks to the efforts of a succession of choirmasters. This continued under the vision of Bishop Michael Marshall, Andrew O’Brien (Director of Music 2002–2015) and organist Michael Brough when Holy Trinity Choir was reborn and the music tradition rebuilt. As well as a professional octet, the associate choir, conQordia continues to serve the church under the direction of Mike Abrams. The church also welcomes visiting choirs.

Organ

John Sedding, himself an organist, provided an unusually large chamber for the noted four-manual J. W. Walker & Sons Ltd organ in the north-east corner. The instrument was badly damaged by enemy action in the Second World War but was repaired in 1947 and partially rebuilt twenty years later in 1967. A definitive rebuild by Harrison & Harrison was completed in August 2012, with the aim of restoring and enlarging the instrument by about 45%, using the surviving Walker pipework and matching new material, confirming its former position as one of the principal organs in London.  There are seventy-one speaking stops and approximately 4,200 pipes.

Organists
Notable organists have included Edwin Lemare (1892–95), Sir Walter Alcock (1895–1902), John Ireland, and H L Balfour (1902–42), all of whom were leading men in their field. A vigorous tradition continues to this day.

The composer John Ireland was Alcock's assistant and had hoped to be promoted when the latter left in 1902, but was regarded as too young to take over. Alcock, on the staff at Westminster Abbey after leaving Holy Trinity, played the organ for three coronations and later moved to Salisbury Cathedral. Later players and assistants have included Ian Curror and Simon Lindley, Arnold Greir and, most notably, Alan Harverson (sometime Professor of Organ at the Royal Academy of Music), Michael Brough, Richard Townend, Andrew O’Brien, Cameron Burns, James Brown and Oliver Lallemant.

Present
Holy Trinity has sponsored international Christian links through a network of friends. From 2004 to 2012, it was the host church for the Awareness Foundation, a teaching and outreach organisation dedicated in part to the increase of interfaith understanding and respect, with branches in other parts of the world, notably in the Middle East and North America.

As a local parish church, Holy Trinity offers a selection of liturgical worship and community events and is a concert venue. Uncluttered by static pews, the vast nave provides flexible space for concerts and events, the focus of some of which mirrors and re-expresses the artistic climate surrounding its first two decades. An arts and crafts guild was established by Michael Marshall early in his incumbency; more recently, an annual summer festival, the Chelsea Schubert Festival, appeared, supplemented by concerts and recitals during the rest of the year.

On 1 November 2011, the parish of St Saviour, Upper Chelsea, was added to that of Holy Trinity and the new parochial unit is the Parish of The Holy and Undivided Trinity with St Saviour, Upper Chelsea, and the church building in Walton Place became a chapel of ease to Holy Trinity.

Notable people associated with the church
Many notable figures have worshipped and assisted at Holy Trinity Sloane Street, which was able to attract them from seemingly opposing sides of the British political spectrum. The colourful Liberals Gladstone and Dilke both attended the church: Gladstone had a habit of marching down the street with Lemare before the main morning service; whilst Dilke lived only yards away in the parish (his house lies further up the road on the west side, today marked by a blue plaque); and his funeral was held at Holy Trinity.

The church soon attracted the attention of Bohemian artists and poets some of whom clustered loosely round Oscar Wilde, whose arrest took place, famously, at the Cadogan Hotel. At the same time, the church figured and still figures high in the cherished heritage of the Cadogan family and its Estate. Extremely popular in the 1920s, there was a very extensive clergy team under the rector, Christopher Cheshire, including, for a time, the priest, ecclesiologist and hymnographer Percy Dearmer.

On 16 January 1896 the marriage of George William Howard Bowen (son of Sir George Ferguson Bowen and Contessa Diamantina di Roma) to Gertrude Chamberlain, niece of Joseph Chamberlain, Colonial Secretary took place here.

There is a memorial on the north wall of the church to Archibald Sturrock (1816–1909), the Chief Locomotive Engineer of the Great Northern Railway from 1850 to 1866. After his early retirement from the railway, he became a magistrate and lived in Upper Chelsea.

The actor Ernest Thesiger was sufficiently active as a member of the congregation at Holy Trinity in the inter-war years to pay for the completion of some of the carved stonework in the chancel.

Notes

External links

 
 Awareness Foundation website
 Chelsea Schubert Festival website
 Sloane Street website

Churches completed in 1890
19th-century Church of England church buildings
Church of England church buildings in the Royal Borough of Kensington and Chelsea
Grade I listed churches in the Royal Borough of Kensington and Chelsea
Diocese of London